The 2015 Uzbekistan First League was the 24th season of second level football in Uzbekistan since independence in 1992. It is split in an eastern and western zone, each featuring 12 teams. As of end of the season Obod won championship and promoted to Uzbek League for 2016 season. The runners-up, Oqtepa after lost by 1-2 in one leg relegation/play-off match against Sogdiana Jizzakh on 25 November 2015 remained in First League.

Teams and locations

Competition format
League consists of two regional groups: conference "East" and "West". The season comprises two phases. The first phase consists of a regular home-and-away schedule: each team plays the other teams twice. 
The top eight teams of the first phase from each zone will be merged in one tournament and compete for the championship.  The bottom four teams of each zone after first phase will play relegation matches to remain in first league.

The draw of the 2015 season was held on 18 February 2015. First League joined FK Yozyovon, Sementchi Kuvasoy. Each regional zones comprises 10 teams. The Tashkent teams Obod, FC Istiqlol and Lokomotiv BFK to play in "West" zone.

First phase

Zone "East"

Zone "West"

Second phase

Championship round
Final standings
The last matchday matches were played on 7 November 2015

Last updated: 7 November 2015
Source: Soccerway

Top goalscorers

References

External links 
PFL - First league results 
Uzbekistan First League 2015 - soccerway

2015
2
Uzbek
Uzbek